Harry Stewart Somers, CC (September 11, 1925 – March 9, 1999) was a contemporary Canadian composer.  Possessing a charismatic attitude and rather dashing good looks, as well as a genuine talent for his art, Somers earned the unofficial title of "Darling of Canadian Composition." 
A truly patriotic artist, Somers was engaged in many national projects over the course his lifetime. He was a founding member of the Canadian League of Composers (CLC) and involved in the formation of other Canadian music organizations, including the Canada Council for the Arts and the Canadian Music Centre. He frequently received commissions from the Canadian Broadcasting Corporation and the Canada Council for the Arts.

Biography

Early life
Somers was born in Toronto, Ontario, Canada, on September 11, 1925. Unlike most composers, Somers did not become involved in formal musical study until he reached his teenage years in 1939 when he met his wife, a doctor who was also an accomplished amateur pianist. She introduced him to classical music. Somers described this first encounter years later:  "A spark was ignited, and I became obsessed with music. Almost from that instant, I knew music would be my life, for better or for worse."

Musical education
The 14-year-old Somers began his intensive study of piano almost immediately after this first exposure under the tutelage of Dorothy Hornfelt, the neighborhood piano teacher. After two short years of study with her, he was able to pass the grade VIII examination of the Toronto Conservatory.

In 1942, Somers began studying under Reginald Godden at the conservatory, whom he stayed with until 1943. It was Godden who recognized Somers' talent for composition and directed him to pursue formal studies under John Weinzweig.  Weinzweig’s avant garde methods of compositions were well-suited to Somers’ budding innovative style. It was Weinzweig who set up a program of traditional harmony study for the young composer as well as introducing him to 12-tone techniques. (Schoenberg had enforced similarly strict lessons in traditional harmony upon his own pupils, even as he encouraged them to explore dodecaphony.) Somers remained under Weinzweig’s instruction until 1949.

Somers took a brief sabbatical from his studies in 1943 to serve with the Royal Canadian Armed Forces in World War II. 
After WWII, Somers returned to the Royal Conservatory to continue his studies with Weinzweig – culminating with a suite for string orchestra – North Country (1948) – and a new piano teacher, Weldon Kilburn. During this time, Somers was writing and performing his own works and had every intention of being both a classical pianist and a composer.  Somers completed his studies at the conservatory in 1948 and then spent the summer in San Francisco studying piano under E. Robert Schmitz. His work was part of the music event in the art competition at the 1948 Summer Olympics.

Despite his great talent and promise as a classical pianist, by 1949, Somers had decided to give up his piano studies and channel his efforts solely into composition.  It was also in 1949 that he was awarded a $2000 Canadian Amateur Hockey Association scholarship that enabled him to spend the year in Paris studying composition with Darius Milhaud. It was there that Somers heard the music of Boulez and Messiaen. These composers would influence his later music.

1950s and 1960s
After his year with Darius Milhaud, Somers spent the 1950s devoted to composition. While he was composing prolifically, he was not yet able to support himself financially and instead, he earned his income as a music copyist.  Yet this occupation was not without benefit to Somers; it allowed him to develop the pristine and meticulous penmanship his manuscripts were renowned for later in his career.

Somers also took the time during the 1950s to become a very accomplished guitar player and used the skill as yet another way to earn money.

The 1960s proved to be a pivotal decade in Somers’ career. He became more involved in diverse aspects of the Canadian music scene and his career as a composer finally took off. Although he had struggled to make a living on his compositions prior to this point in his career, this was the decade in which Somers no longer needed to hold a permanent position at any establishment and instead was able to live off of his commissions alone.

He began the decade by returning to Paris for more compositional studies, thanks to a Canada Council for the Arts fellowship. While there, he concentrated on Gregorian chant, particularly its revival by the Solesmes Abbey.

When he returned to Canada, Somers became interested in how young people were being exposed to and educated about Canadian music. He sought to improve upon their education via a number of different methods. In 1963, he became a member of the John Adaskin Project, which was an in-school initiative involving the teaching and performance of Canadian music in schools.  Also, in 1963, Somers began his part-time career with the Canadian Broadcasting Corporation by hosting televised youth concerts.

1963 also brought sadness to Somers life when his first wife, Catherine Mackie, died.

In 1965, Somers began hosting the CBC radio series, 'Music of Today' and continued hosting it until 1969.  He also became the special consultant of the North York School in Toronto from 1968-9.

In 1967 he remarried, to the Canadian actress Barbara Chilcott.  This was also the year that he produced his best known work, the opera Louis Riel, commissioned for Canada’s Centennial Year celebrations.

Somers ended the decade as he began it; studying composition in Europe. In 1969, he received an $18 000 grant from the Canadian Cultural Institute in Rome. He spent two years there, during which time he wrote his famous works for voice: Voiceplay and Kyrie.

1970s and 1980s

If the 1960s was the decade wherein Somers proved himself as a composer, the 1970s were the years wherein the rest of Canada honored him for that achievement. In 1971, after he returned to Canada from his work in Rome, Somers was made a Companion of the Order of Canada, due to his national and international recognition as a composer. He was awarded three honorary doctorates; one from the University of Ottawa (1975), one from York University (1975) and one from the University of Toronto (1976).

In 1977, Somers made a visit to the USSR. While there, he heard many of his pieces performed, gave lectures on Contemporary Canadian composition, and spoke to other contemporary composers.

During the 1980s, Somers was kept very busy, receiving many commissions for numerous national music events and organizations, including the Banff International String Quartet Competition, the Guelph Spring Festival, the S.C. Eckhardt-Gramatté Competition and the Canadian Opera Company.

1990s

By the time he reached the 1990s, Somers had indisputably cemented his reputation as one of the greatest composers Canada had ever produced. As such, he was permitted to be more selective of who he chose to compose for in his old age and showed preference for his favourite artists.

Despite his age, Somers still kept active within the Canadian and international music communities, giving the opening address at the Alberta Music Conference in 1993, writing a choral piece for the 50th Anniversary of the United Nations in 1995 and serving as the writer-in-residence for the first "Word and Music Festival" held at the University of Windsor in 1997. 

Canada honoured him in 1995 with tribute concerts given by the University of Ottawa and the National Arts Centre for his 70th birthday.

Somers died on March 9, 1999, in Toronto, Ontario.

Composer

Harry Somers was immensely successful as a composer. He had an eclectic, personal approach to 20th century styles and composed a large body of work that walked a fine line between an elite modernity and popular appeal. His works were performed nationally and internationally during his lifetime, with performances in the USA, Central and South Americas, Europe and the Soviet Union. His output consisted essentially of tonal works that incorporated elements of atonality later on in his career.

Somers described his approach to composition as follows:

"Over the years I've worked consistently on three different levels with three different approaches to composition. On one level my approach has been what I call 'community music' or 'music for use': For example music for amateurs and music for school use. On a second level I've created 'functional music,' in the specific sense: music for television, films and theatre, where the composition has to work in company with another medium and serve the demands of that medium. On a third level I have created without consideration for any limitations, sometimes completely experimentally, sometimes extending the line of a particular direction on which I had been working through a series of works.
In short, the first two levels relate directly to the environment and society, in the broad sense, in which I live at the moment, and in which I function as a craftsman; the third relates to a more restricted audience (though I'm not convinced it need be so) and my personal development as an artist."

Style
Somers music is known for its diversity of influences and themes. Due to the isolated nature of Toronto during the 20th century, the city in which he first began composing, Somers was fortunate enough to develop his own sense of originality before he began his formal compositional studies. Once he began studying at the Royal Conservatory, his sources of influence increased and his musical palate grew as well. The people and styles that are said to have influence him the most are the music of Weinzweig, Bartók and Ives, Baroque counterpoint, serial technique and Gregorian chant.  Somers himself said that he aimed to "unify conceptions of the Baroque … with the high tensioned elements of our own time" in many of his compositions. Somers also makes great and unique use of dynamics. He developed a technique for creating what he referred to as ‘dynamic unrest’ which consists of one sound sustained, be it chord or singular pitch, isolated or prolonged in a melodic line, developing a dynamic envelope of its own.

It was under the guidance of Weinzweig during the 1940s that Somers received his first formal instruction in composition. Prior to that point, he composed mainly in the style of the piano works he was playing, but with a notable creative spark.  With Weinzweig, this spark was fanned into a flame and Somers’ compositional style refined. He began working with thinner textures, developed a more horizontally orientated approach to his pieces and established control over motivic coherence.   These developments can be seen most clearly in the outer movements of North Country (1948), a four-movement suite for string orchestra.  In this work, Somers uses "nervous rhythmic vitality, sparse textures in a relatively dissonant context and lean melodic lines in a high register (often contrasting sharply with a driving ostinato-like accompaniment) [to] subtly evoke the bleakness, loneliness and strength of the northern Ontario landscape."
During the 1950s, Somers focused on two main ideas in his compositions: the use of fugue-related textures and techniques, and the use of different styles and techniques within the same work.  Well over half of the works written between 1950 and 1961 contain fugal movements or sections. Many more feature "sharp, nervous, rhythmic vitality, which often serves as a foil for slower-moving subsidiary melodic lines."  Demonstrations of these ideas can be heard in his Passacaglia and Fugue (1954), the last section of String Quartet no.3 and the second sections of Five Concepts.

Serialism

Somers’s approach to serialism was intuitive and always kept within the realm of accessibility.
When he began his studies with Weinzweig, Somers dabbled in the use of serialism in his music, but he refrained from drastically implementing it into his pieces until 1950. Even then, it was never the main aspect of his work, but rather acted as supportive material for other elements.  Prior to 1959, he tended to keep sections that included serial elements contained within tonal confines.    It wasn't until the beginning of the 1960s that Somers began to broaden his scope, increasing his experimentation with non-thematic textures and with the visual and spatial aspects of performance.

Instrumental works
Many of Somers’ instrumental works are classics of Canadian music. The style and innovations they display "document the efforts of a generation to break away from the traditional language of older, European-trained colleagues."  Some of Somers’ most notable instrumental works include:
Suite for harp and chamber orchestra (1949)
Symphony no.1 (1951) 
Passacaglia and Fugue (1954) 
Fantasia for Orchestra (1958)
Five Concepts for Orchestra (1961)
Twelve Miniatures (1963)
Stereophony (1963): a piece commissioned by the Toronto Symphony Orchestra. Often regarded as one of his most important and original orchestral score, it displays many elements of his earlier writing. It is performed by two string orchestras on the platform, with musicians scattered throughout the performance space and thus it is deliberately impossible to achieve synchronization.
Picasso Suite (1964).
Movement for String Quartet (1982) 
Elegy, Transformation, Jubilation(1981)

Operatic and vocal works
Somers composed many popular operatic, choral and chamber works. Exploring and experimenting with new vocal techniques was one of his main compositional focuses from the mid-1960s to the mid-1980s.   His resulting works includes techniques such as vocalization, vowel and breath sounds, and timbral inflections. Some of Somers’ most notable works for voice include:
The Fool (1953). A one-act chamber opera.
Twelve Miniatures (1964)
Evocations (1966)
Crucifixion (1966)
Louis Riel (1967). Commissioned for the Canadian Centennial. Somers' only work to feature electronic sounds (used in the battle scene in Act 1). 
Five Songs of the Newfoundland Outports (1969) shows him clearly working within the choral mainstream. These five accessible arrangements of Newfoundland folk songs have become popular with choirs around the world.
Voiceplay (1971)
Kyrie (1971)

Notes

References
 Canadian League of Composers. History of the CLC. History of the CLC
 Canadian Music Centre. Harry Somers: Biography Harry Somers: Biography
 Cherney, Brian. 1975. Harry Somers. University of Toronto Press. 
Cherney, Brian. "Somers, Harry." Grove Music Online. Oxford Music Online. Oxford University Press, Somers, Harry
 Cherney, Brian. "Somers, Harry." The New Grove Dictionary of Opera. Grove Music Online. Oxford Music Online. Oxford University Press, Somers, Harry
 King, Becky Nygaard, John Beckwith and Brian Cherney. Historica Canada (The Canadian Encyclopedia). Harry Somers. Harry Somers
 Somers, Harry. 2007. Composer Portraits Series CD. Centredisks Canada.
 Zinck, Andrew M. 1993. "Bridging the Gap: The Operas of Harry Somers." SoundNotes. SN4:14-24.

External links
 Harry Somers at The Canadian Encyclopedia (Includes a complete list of compositions written by Somers.)
 Somers, Harry at The Canadian Music Centre Online
 Harry Somers Artist Profile at CBC Radio Music Website
 Harry Somers Website
 Harry Somers fonds (R12599) at Library and Archives Canada

1925 births
1999 deaths
Canadian classical composers
Canadian male classical composers
Canadian opera composers
Concert band composers
Male opera composers
Companions of the Order of Canada
Juno Award for Classical Composition of the Year winners
Musicians from Toronto
Pupils of Darius Milhaud
20th-century classical composers
20th-century Canadian composers
Olympic competitors in art competitions
Canadian military personnel of World War II
20th-century Canadian male musicians